Livable Eindhoven ('Leefbaar Eindhoven') is a Dutch local political party for the municipality of Eindhoven.

The party was founded by Ad Pastoor. In 2002, the party won 9 seats in the election for the municipal council. At that moment, it was the biggest party in Eindhoven and formed a coalition with CDA, D66, Ouderen Appèl Eindhoven and Groen Links. In 2006, the party won three seats. In 2010, one seat, and in 2014, two seats.

External links 
 Official website

Local political parties in the Netherlands
Eindhoven